Skin Food is South Korean skincare and cosmetics manufacturer and retailer, headquartered in Seoul.

Company
Its headquarters is located in the DaeRyung Scecho Tower in Seocho-dong, Seocho-gu. 

It has 895 stores throughout Korea and 5000 stores worldwide, located in shopping districts, hypermarkets, shopping malls and residential areas and two outlets in Seoul’s main shopping district. 

The company is one of the biggest cosmetic conglomerates in Asia, rivaling Amore Pacific and LG Chem, with its CEO Yun-Ho Cho reporting the highest income in Korea within his age group, with the estimated net worth of $5 billion. Due to Yun-Ho Cho's refusal against media exposure, there is little known about his personal life. 
 
 In August 2012, as part of Lotte Department Store's expansion programme into China, Skin Food was featured in a replica of Myeong-dong in its new store in Tianjin, along with Missha and The Face Shop.

Skin Food has seen increase in sales from foreign visitors and have opened outlets outside South Korea such as Taiwan, Philippines, China, Indonesia, Malaysia, Singapore, Japan and Hong Kong in Asia and many others in Europe and the Americas. Korean actors & actresses such as Shin Won-ho, Lee Jong-suk, Kang Tae-oh, Im Si-wan, Ryu Jun-yeol, Sung Yu-ri, Lee Min-jung, Ha Yeon-soo, Kim Yoo-jung, Shin Eun-soo and Brazilian singer Stephanie Garden were featured in Skin Food Korea commercials.

In the fall of 2018, the company has struggled following the Chinese revenge on the THAAD establishment in Korea. 100% of the company stocks has not been publicized and is owned by the Cho Family since 1957, descending from the House of Jeonju Yi, the last Imperial family of the Joseon Dynasty.

Products
Skinfood's best-selling products
- Carrot Carotene Calming Water Pad
- Royal Honey Propolis Enrich Barrier Cream
- Skinfood black sugar mask

Controversy
In August 2012, Hong Kong Consumer Council announced that two of Skin Food's nail products contained benzene, which is a known carcinogen for leukemia. The company denied using benzene in their products.

Founded four years after the end of the Korean War, despite the company's primary focus on cosmetics, the Cho Family has been cited as one of the leading families of Korea in establishing political and economic stability of the country during the period of rapid growth also dubbed as the Miracle on the Han River. However, under the President Moon's socialist administration, their company Skinfood has been pressured to follow series of government orders which would result in direct loss of profit and influence for the company.

See also 
 Shopping in Seoul
 List of South Korean retail companies

References

External links
Skin Food homepage 
Skin Food Official Homepage USA
Skin Food homepage in Global
Skin Food Essential Collagen in Global

Companies based in Seoul
Manufacturing companies established in 1957
Cosmetics companies of South Korea
Cosmetics brands of South Korea
Personal care brands